Anmol Moti  ( Precious Pearl) is a 1969 Indian action film, produced and directed by S.D. Narang on Narang Films banner. Starring Jeetendra, Babita  and music composed by Ravi.

Plot
Manik (Jagdeep) is a fisherman living in a small village near a seacoast with his father Gokul (Jayant), who is the Mukhiya of the village. Manik is in love with Lakshmi (Shabnam), who is from the same village and they are soon to marry each other. After their marriage, the next morning there is the procession of Nariyal Purnima, where the fishermen used to go in search of pearls in the sea and it was Manik's first time participating in this procession. While he dived into the sea, in search of pearls, he was killed in an accident where he was trapped by an octopus and couldn't set himself free. Soon, his wife Lakshmi is pregnant and she gives birth to a girl child, but after the birth, Lakshmi also dies leaving her child behind with Gokul. Due to the reason of his death in the sea, the government banned the fishermen from diving into the sea for going in search of pearls, which was the only way that helped the fishermen to survive on their daily needs. How will the fishermen survive without any work in the village and fulfill their needs? Will the Mukhiya of the village Gokul be able to help them?

Cast
Jeetendra as Vijay 
Babita as Roopa
Jayant as Gokul
Jeevan as Charan Das
Ifthekar as Doctor
Jagdeep as Manik
D.K. Sapru as Zamindar
Rajendra Nath
Tun Tun
Veena as Lakshmi
Aruna Irani
Shabnam

Soundtrack 
The soundtrack was composed by Ravi and lyrics by Rajendra Krishan.

References

External links
 

Films scored by Ravi
1960s Hindi-language films